Pirogoshi Cave is a cave in Albania. It is 1500m long and is located near Çorovodë, Radesh village, Skrapar.

See also  
 Geography of Albania
 Protected areas of Albania

References 

Caves of Albania
Geography of Berat County
Tourist attractions in Berat County